Anak Agung Istri Ratih Kania Atmaja (born: 28 May 1998) is an Indonesian swimmer. She competed in numerous international events representing Indonesia and received bronze in the 2017 Southeast Asian Games. She also competed in domestic competitions representing Jakarta.

References 

Living people
1998 births
Indonesian female swimmers
Indonesian female freestyle swimmers
Indonesian Hindus
Female backstroke swimmers
Sportspeople from Bali
People from Badung Regency
Southeast Asian Games bronze medalists for Indonesia
Southeast Asian Games medalists in swimming
Competitors at the 2017 Southeast Asian Games
Competitors at the 2021 Southeast Asian Games